25T7-NBOMe (also known as 2C-T-7-NBOMe or NBOMe-2C-T-7), is a substituted phenethylamine derivative from the 25-NB family. It acts as an agonist at the 5-HT2A and 5-HT2C serotonin receptors, has psychedelic effects and has been sold as a designer drug. It is illegal in Brazil.

See also 
 2C-T-7
 25E-NBOH
 25P-NBOMe

References 

Thioethers